Columbus-Lowndes County Airport  is a public use airport located three nautical miles (6 km) southeast of the central business district of Columbus, a city in Lowndes County, Mississippi, United States. It is owned by the City of Columbus and Lowndes County.

Facilities and aircraft 
Columbus-Lowndes County Airport covers an area of 215 acres (87 ha) at an elevation of 188 feet (57 m) above mean sea level. It has one runway designated 18/36 with an asphalt surface measuring 4,500 by 100 feet (1,372 x 30 m).

For the 12-month period ending January 18, 2012, the airport had 13,200 aircraft operations, an average of 36 per day: 96% general aviation, 2% air taxi, and 2% military. At that time there were 24 aircraft based at this airport: 71% single-engine, 12.5% multi-engine, 12.5% ultralight, and 4% glider.

See also 
 List of airports in Mississippi

References

External links 
 Aerial image as of February 1996 from USGS The National Map
 
 

Airports in Mississippi
Buildings and structures in Lowndes County, Mississippi
Transportation in Lowndes County, Mississippi